Come Fly With Me is a Canadian music variety television series which aired on CBC Television in 1958.

Premise
This series replaced Front Page Challenge between the 1957 and 1958 television seasons. It was recorded in various international locations such as Banff, Edinburgh, Los Angeles, New York City, Niagara Falls, Paris, Rome, San Francisco and Vancouver. Host Shane Rimmer was joined by Don Wright's vocal group and Rudy Toth's orchestra.

The debut episode (24 June 1958) featured guest Barry Morse who sang the My Fair Lady musical number "Why Can't the English".

Scheduling
This half-hour series was broadcast Tuesdays at 8:00 p.m. (Eastern) from 24 June to 16 September 1958.

References

External links
 
 

CBC Television original programming
1958 Canadian television series debuts
1958 Canadian television series endings
1950s Canadian music television series
1950s Canadian variety television series
English-language television shows
Black-and-white Canadian television shows